The Duvall–Ash Farmstead is a historic farm located northeast of Fiatt in Fulton County, Illinois. Edward Duvall built the farm's oldest buildings, the house and smokehouse, circa 1848. Duvall gave the farmhouse a Gothic Revival design with multiple front-facing gables decorated with bargeboards and topped by finials. In the 1890s, Singleton K. Ash purchased and extensively renovated the farm. Ash placed a Victorian addition on the rear of the house which featured decorative stickwork and bracketing. In addition, Ash and his family built most of the farm's current outbuildings, which include a chicken coop, barns, and storage sheds; these outbuildings form a complete collection of typical outbuildings from an 1890s farm.

The farm was added to the National Register of Historic Places on November 12, 1993.

References

Farms on the National Register of Historic Places in Illinois
Gothic Revival architecture in Illinois
National Register of Historic Places in Fulton County, Illinois